Nobo Kumar Bhadra (born 1964) is one of the known rickshaw painters of Bangladesh. Rickshaw paint is a traditional folk art of Bangladesh

Life and work 
Nobo Kumar was born in Shakhari bazar, a place in the old town of capital city Dhaka. He started by painting banner for cinema halls along with his father in late 70s Dhaka. Later, his neighbor introduced him to rickshaw painting. Nobo Kumar dropped out of school when he was in grade six. Poverty did not allow him to continue school and he had to start working along with his father in painting banners for cinema halls. Nobo had naturally acquired the sense of color and strokes for which his neighbor, Sitesh Sur, who was a rickshaw painter made him his pupil. Nobo Kumar calls him his ustad or master for rickshaw painting. The neighborhood he was born in has artists of different kind, he could take his painting for selling quite easily. He started his journey in the art world in 1987. He has been in this field for more than 25 years.

Artworks

Philosophy 
Nobo Kumar's fundamental philosophy behind his artworks is to give people pleasure. He uses bright and vibrant colors to create characters in bizarre actions to achieve his philosophy.

Exhibitions 
Summer in Colour, Zoom Galerie of Alliance Française de Dhaka

References

External links
 

1964 births
Living people
Bangladeshi painters
Rickshaws